Gul Muhammad Khan Jakhrani is a Pakistani politician who was a member of the National Assembly of Pakistan from 2008 to 2013.

Political career
He was elected to the National Assembly of Pakistan from Constituency NA-210 (Kashmore) as a candidate of Pakistan Peoples Party (PPP) in 2008 Pakistani general election. He received 82,189 votes and defeated Asghar Ali Khan Bijarani, a candidate of Jamiat Ulama-e-Islam (S) (JUI-S).

He is currently Coordinator Pakistan Peoples Party (PPP)  district Badin Sindh   and District President Pakistan Peoples Party (PPP)  Kashmore District Kashmore, Sindh 

He remained Advisor to Chief Minister, Sindh for Prisons Department.
2. Federal Parliamentary Secretary for Defence Production and 
3. Federal Parliamentary Secretary for Education from 2008 to 2013 in Pakistan Peoples Party Government.

References

Living people
Pakistani MNAs 2008–2013
Year of birth missing (living people)